Yellow Bird is an album by Lawrence Welk and His Orchestra. It was released in 1966 on the Dot label (catalog no. DLP-25774). It included the single, "Yellow Bird". The album debuted on Billboard magazine's popular albums chart on August 7, 1961, reached the No. 2 spot, and remained on that chart for 41 weeks

Track listing

Side 1
 "Yellow Bird" (Bergman, Keith, Luboff) [2:15]
 "Don't Worry" (Marty Robbins) [2:32]
 "Goodnight, Irene" (Ledbetter, Lomax) [2:40]
 "Runaway" (Westover, Crook) [2:25]
 "Mockin' Bird Hill" (Vaughn) [1:54]
 "Marianne" (Miller, Dehr, Gilkyson) [2:04]

Side 2
 "My Love For You" (George Cates) [2:00]
 "Heartbreak Hotel" (Presley, Axton, Durden) [2:10]
 "Harbor Lights" (Williams, Kennedy) [2:18]
 "Love Those Eyes" (George Cates) [2:16]
 "Loch Lomond" (adapted by George Cates) [2:03]
 "Juanita" (adapted by George Cates) [2:29]

References

1961 albums
Dot Records albums
Lawrence Welk albums